Begovoy District  is an administrative district (raion) of Northern Administrative Okrug, and one of the 125 raions of Moscow, Russia. Population: 37,900 (2017 est.)

Economy

The aviation companies Mikoyan (MiG) and Sukhoi have their head offices in the Begovoy District.
There are factories such as Rumyantsev MPO, Znamya Truda (MiG), Duks and Temp.

See also

Administrative divisions of Moscow

References

Notes

Sources

Districts of Moscow
Northern Administrative Okrug